Daria Vitalyevna Semianova  (born 13 August 2002) is a Russian sport shooter. She represents Russia at the 2020 Summer Olympics in Tokyo.

References

2002 births
Living people
Russian female sport shooters
Shooters at the 2020 Summer Olympics
Olympic shooters of Russia
Sportspeople from Makhachkala
Shooters at the 2019 European Games
European Games bronze medalists for Russia
European Games medalists in shooting
21st-century Russian women